Yevgeniya Viktorovna Estes (born 17 July 1975 in Sverdlovsk), née Artamonova (Артамонова), is a Russian volleyball player, who was a member of the national team and one of only two volleyball players (along with Sergey Tetyukhin) that competed consecutively in six Olympic Games and took the silver medals at the 1992 Summer Olympics in Barcelona, 2000 Summer Olympics in Sydney, and the 2004 Summer Olympics in Athens.

She also won the Most Beautiful Women Volleyball Player Award, which was held on the occasion of FIVB World Grand Champions Cup 1993 and sponsored by Japanese Monthly Volleyball Magazine. As a member of TOYOBO, she won the first runner-up of "Miss V-League".

Honors
 1991 World Under-20 Championship — 1st place
 1991 World Cup — 3rd place
 1992 European Junior Championship — 1st place
 1992 Olympic Games — 2nd place
 1993 FIVB World Grand Prix — 3rd place
 1993 European Championship — 1st place
 1993 World Grand Champions Cup — 3rd place
 1994 Goodwill Games — 1st place
 1994 World Championship — 3rd place
 1995 World Under-20 Championship — 3rd place
 1995 European Championship — 3rd place
 1996 FIVB World Grand Prix — 3rd place
 1996 Olympic Games — 4th place
 1997 FIVB World Grand Prix — 1st place
 1997 European Championship — 1st place
 1997 World Grand Champions Cup — 1st place
 1998 FIVB World Grand Prix — 2nd place
 1998 World Championship — 3rd place
 1999 FIVB World Grand Prix — 1st place
 1999 European Championship — 1st place
 1999 World Cup — 2nd place
 2000 FIVB World Grand Prix — 2nd place
 2000 Olympic Games — 2nd place
 2001 FIVB World Grand Prix — 3rd place
 2001 European Championship — 1st place
 2001 World Grand Champions Cup — 2nd place
 2002 FIVB World Grand Prix — 1st place
 2002 World Championship — 3rd place
 2003 FIVB World Grand Prix — 2nd place
 2004 Olympic Games — 2nd place
 2008 Olympic Games — 5th place
 2012 Olympic Games — 5th place

Trivia
Aru-chan (Evguenia's nickname in Japan)
On the court, she rarely shows her feelings, which made Japanese media nickname her “Ice doll”.

During the Russia-Japan game of the World Grand Prix 1995 she fell down because of a knee injury. The knee was operated unsuccessfully on the previous year.

Individual awards
 1997 World Grand Champions Cup "Most Valuable Player"
 1999 European Championship "Most Valuable Player"
 2002 World Grand Prix "Most Valuable Player"

References
 Yevgeniya Estes at Olympics at Sports-Reference.com

External links
 
 

1975 births
Living people
Russian women's volleyball players
Soviet women's volleyball players
Olympic volleyball players of the Unified Team
Olympic volleyball players of Russia
Volleyball players at the 1992 Summer Olympics
Volleyball players at the 1996 Summer Olympics
Volleyball players at the 2000 Summer Olympics
Volleyball players at the 2004 Summer Olympics
Volleyball players at the 2008 Summer Olympics
Volleyball players at the 2012 Summer Olympics
Olympic silver medalists for the Unified Team
Olympic silver medalists for Russia
Takefuji Bamboo players
Sportspeople from Yekaterinburg
Eczacıbaşı volleyball players
Olympic medalists in volleyball
Medalists at the 2004 Summer Olympics
Medalists at the 2000 Summer Olympics
Medalists at the 1992 Summer Olympics
Competitors at the 1994 Goodwill Games
Goodwill Games medalists in volleyball